Interstate 55 (I-55) in Tennessee lies entirely within the city of Memphis, located in Shelby County. The highway enters the city from Southaven in Desoto County, Mississippi, and passes through the Whitehaven area of the city, bypassing Memphis International Airport to the west.

Route description

I-55 enters Tennessee from Mississippi, heading north to an interchange with I-240. I-55 then turns westward for a brief period before turning northward again. Just before reaching downtown, the highway turns westward again at E.H. Crump Boulevard and crosses the Mississippi River via the Memphis & Arkansas Bridge into West Memphis, in Crittenden County, Arkansas.

I-55 provides an alternate route for motorists who do not want to take I-240 and I-40 through downtown to cross the Mississippi River.

History
The Memphis and Arkansas Bridge, the first link of what is now I-55, was integrated into the Interstate system. Construction began on September 12, 1945, and the bridge opened to traffic on December 17, 1949. The first segment of I-55 to begin construction after the passage of the Interstate Highway Act of 1956 was the section between the Mississippi State Line and U.S. Route 51 (US 51)/Brooks Road in early 1959. This segment opened to traffic on December 2, 1961, and was the first completed freeway segment in Memphis. On March 18, 1966, the section between I-240 and US 61 (Third Street) was opened. The section between US 61 and South Parkway opened on October 14, 1966. Work on the last section, located between South Parkway and the Memphis and Arkansas Bridge and which consisted of upgrading a stretch of Crump Boulevard between the bridge and the cloverleaf interchange to freeway standards, began on September 11, 1964, and was opened on April 20, 1967.

I-55 was widened from four to eight lanes between the Mississippi state line and the I-240 interchange in two phases. The first phase, which took place between February 1999 and June 2001, widened the section between Winchester Road and I-240, and the second phase, which ran from early 2000 to July 2002, widened the highway between the state line and Winchester Road.

On January 18, 2008, the Federal Highway Administration (FHWA) authorized the states of Mississippi and Tennessee to extend I-69 from the I-40/State Route 300 (SR 300) interchange in north Memphis to the I-55/I-69 interchange in Hernando; however, Tennessee has  signed the extension of the route, although Mississippi has already done so.

Future
There are currently plans to revamp the I-55/Crump Boulevard Interchange. Prior to 2011, northbound traffic had to merge on a one-lane loop with a tight radius while traffic going from I-55 southbound to Riverside Drive merged into traffic on another loop ramp. This has caused several accidents over the years. A temporary solution has been put into effect by making the northbound loop into two lanes, eliminating I-55 southbound to Riverside Drive loop and creating a left turn lane for I-55 to Riverside Drive traffic. This eliminated having to make a lane change in order to stay on I-55 northbound. In 2021, a second lane was added for I-55 southbound in response to the Hernando de Soto Bridge closure. 

In 2012, the FHWA approved TDOT's permanent solution. The planned project eliminated the cloverleaf entirely and added two flyover ramps for Interstate traffic and a roundabout to accommodate Riverside Drive traffic, E.H. Crump Boulevard traffic, and the I-55 entrance/exit ramps. The project, originally scheduled to begin in 2018, was on hold due to controversy over the nine-month closure of the Memphis & Arkansas Bridge during the project. On March 30, 2022, TDOT awarded a $141.2 million contract for the project; work is expected to be completed in early 2025. The project shortens the closure time of the Memphis & Arkansas Bridge to two weeks.

Exit list

References

Transportation in Memphis, Tennessee
Transportation in Shelby County, Tennessee
55
 Tennessee